The Golden Dustman may refer to:
Henry Dodd, founder of the Thames barge races 
Nicodemus (Noddy) Boffin, character in Dickens' Our Mutual Friend, possibly based on Dodd